The Asian Pacific Journal of Cancer Prevention is a biweekly peer-reviewed open access medical journal covering oncology. It was established in 2000 and is published by the Asian Pacific Organization for Cancer Prevention, of which it is the official journal. It is also the official journal of the International Association of Cancer Registries. The editor-in-chief is Alireza Mosavi Jarrahi (Shahid Beheshti University of Medical Sciences Tehran, Iran).

Abstracting and indexing 
The journal is abstracted and indexed in Index Medicus/MEDLINE/PubMed, and Scopus. According to the Journal Citation Reports, the journal has a 2014 impact factor of 2.514 but has not had an impact factor recorded since then.

References

External links 

Oncology journals
Publications established in 2000
Biweekly journals
Online-only journals
English-language journals
Academic journals published by learned and professional societies
Open access journals